The following is a list of episodes from The Hub original series Pound Puppies.

Series overview

Episodes

Season 1 (2010–12)

Season 2 (2012)
At the Hub Upfront, a second season was confirmed. It premiered June 2, 2012.

The second season introduced the Super Secret Pup Club, Rebound, Cupcake, and (new for season 2) Patches. In addition, Rebound, Cupcake and Patches are featured in the opening theme during the second season giving tags to the puppies going to their new homes.

Season 3 (2013)
In June 2012, Yvette Nicole Brown (the voice of Cookie), confirmed that a 3rd season is in production. In January 2013, she confirmed that the season would contain about 26 episodes. Tim Stuby directed with Jos Humphrey and Greg Sullivan in Season 3.

References

External links
 
 

Lists of American children's animated television series episodes
Lists of Canadian children's animated television series episodes
Pound Puppies